Louisiana's 7th congressional district was a congressional district in the U.S. state of Louisiana located in the southwestern part of the state. It last contained the cities of Crowley, Eunice, Jennings, Lafayette, Lake Charles, Opelousas, Sulphur and Ville Platte.

The district became obsolete for the 113th Congress in 2013 as Louisiana had lost a seat in the U.S. House of Representatives redistricting based upon results from the 2010 Census post Hurricane Katrina population losses in the state. Most of the territory in this district became the 3rd district.

List of members representing the district

Recent election results

2002

2004

2006

2008

2010

References

 Congressional Biographical Directory of the United States 1774–present

Former congressional districts of the United States
07
1903 establishments in Louisiana
2013 disestablishments in Louisiana
Constituencies established in 1903
Constituencies disestablished in 2013